Navtej Singh Sarna (born 1957) is an Indian author-columnist, diplomat and former Indian Ambassador to the United States. He previously served as the High Commissioner of India to the United Kingdom, and the Ambassador to Israel.

Early life and career
He was born in Jalandhar, East Punjab, India to noted writer in Punjabi, Mohinder Singh Sarna and Punjabi poetess and translator Surjit Sarna, and did his schooling from St. Joseph's Academy, Dehradun. Later he joined the Indian Foreign Service in 1980. He was the longest-serving spokesperson of the Indian Foreign Ministry (six years), under two prime ministers, three foreign ministers and four foreign secretaries, till the end of his term in September, 2008.

Previously as a diplomat served in Moscow, Warsaw, Thimphu, Geneva, Teheran and Washington, DC. He Served as India's ambassador to Israel from 2008 to 2012, High Commissioner to the UK 2016 and as India's ambassador to the United States from November 2016 to December 2018 and retired from the Indian Foreign Service on Dec 31, 2018 after serving his country for over 36 years.

Writing career
Navtej Sarna's first novel published was We Weren't Lovers Like That in 2003, followed by The Book of Nanak was published in the same year.'The Exile' published in 2008, is a novel based on the life of Duleep Singh, the last Maharaja of the Sikh Empire, and son of Maharaja Ranjit Singh. His short stories which have appeared earlier in the London Magazine and broadcast over BBC have been put together in the collection 'Winter Evenings.' He translated the 'Zafarnama', the letter written in Persian verse by Guru Gobind Singh to emperor Aurungzeb. 'Savage Harvest' is Sarna's translation of thirty of his father's short stories on partition of India from Punjabi to English. Sarna has also contributed extensively to journals and newspapers in India and abroad including The Financial Times, Times Literary Supplement, The Hindu, Hindustan Times, etc. His literary columns written over seven years for The Hindu have now appeared as a book entitled 'Second Thoughts on Books, Authors and the Writerly Life.'

In 2022, he wrote Crimson Spring, on the Jallianwala Bagh massacre. He appeared on The Literary City with Ramjee Chandran podcast to talk about his book.

Personal life
Ambassador Sarna speaks English, Hindi, Punjabi and has knowledge of Russian and Polish languages also. He is married to Dr. Avina Sarna and has one son and one daughter.

Publications
 Folk Tales of Poland, Sterling Publications, 1991. .
 We Weren't Lovers Like That. Penguin, May 2003. .
 The Book of Nanak, Penguin, September 2003. .
 The Exile. Penguin, 2008. .
 'Zafarnama'- a translation, Penguin 2011
 'Winter Evenings'- a collection of short stories, Rupa Rainlight 2012
 'Savage Harvest'- a translation of partition stories of Mohinder Singh Sarna, Rupa 2013.
 'Indians at Herod's Gate'- a Jerusalem narrative, Rupa Rainlight 2014.
 'Second Thoughts- on books, authors and the writerly life'- HarperCollins 2015

Within anthologies

 Journeys : Heroes, Pilgrims, Explores, edited by Geeti Sen and Molly Kaushal. New Delhi, Penguin, 2004. . 2. And the Baba went along the way, by Navtej Sarna.
 The Harper Collins Book of New Indian Fiction : Contemporary Writing in English, edited by Khushwant Singh. New Delhi, HarperCollins, 2005, . . 5. Madame Kitty by Navtej Sarna.
 'Signals', a London Magazine anthology, UK

See also
Harsh V Shringla
Vijay Gokhale
Taranjit Singh Sandhu
Dr. Subrahmanyam Jaishankar

References

External links

 Biography - Official website
 

1957 births
Living people
Punjabi people
Indian Sikhs
Ambassadors of India to Israel
High Commissioners of India to the United Kingdom
Ambassadors of India to the United States
Indian Foreign Service officers
Indian columnists
Punjabi-language writers
Indian historical novelists
20th-century Indian novelists
20th-century Indian short story writers
People from Jalandhar
Novelists from Punjab, India